Anthony Schneider (born May 17, 1933) was a Canadian professional hockey player who played 261 games in the  American Hockey League for the Buffalo Bisons and Springfield Indians. He also played in the Quebec Hockey League with the Quebec Aces and in the Western Hockey League with the Victoria Cougars. From 1965 to 1968, he coached the Calgary Spurs in the Western Canada Senior Hockey League.

External links
 

1933 births
Living people
Buffalo Bisons (AHL) players
Canadian ice hockey defencemen
Ice hockey people from Saskatchewan
Quebec Aces (QSHL) players
Sportspeople from Regina, Saskatchewan
Springfield Indians players